Vishwanath Tripathi (born 16 February 1931) is a Hindi writer. He has around 20 publications to his credit which include literary criticism, memoirs and poetry collection.

Works
 Hindi Aalochana
 Lokwadi Tulsidas
 Meera Ka Kavya
 Desh ke is Daur Main (criticism on essays of Harishankar parsai)
 Kuch Kahaniyan Kuch Vichar (short story criticism)
 Ped Ka Hath (criticism on poetry of Kedarnath Agarwal)
 Jaisa Kah Saka (poetry selection; revised edition - 'Premchand biskohar me')
 Nangatalai Ka Gaon. (autobiographical memoirs)
 Ganga snan karne chaloge
 Vyomakesh darvesh (Biography and criticism of Hazari Prasad Dwivedi)
 Guruji ki kheti-bari
 Apana des-pardes
 Kahani ke sath-sath (short story criticism)
 Upanyas ka ant nahi hua hai
 Aalochak ka samajik dayitwa

Awards
 Moortidevi Award, 2014
 Vyas Samman, 2013

References

1931 births
Living people
Writers from Uttar Pradesh
Hindi-language writers
Banaras Hindu University alumni
Panjab University alumni
People from Basti district